Two for the Money is a 1972 American TV film.

Cast
Robert Hooks as Larry Dean
Stephen Brooks
Walter Brennan as Cody Guilford
Cathy Burns as Judith Gap
Neville Brand as Sheriff Harley
Shelley Fabares as Bethany Hagen
Anne Revere as Mrs Gap
Mercedes McCambridge as Mrs Castle
Richard Dreyfuss as Morris Gap
Skip Homeier as Doctor
Michael Fox as Hospital Administrator
Mady Maguire as Waitress

References

External links

1972 television films
1972 films
ABC Movie of the Week
Films directed by Bernard L. Kowalski